The Estonian Supercup is Estonian football's annual super cup, contested between the champions of the previous Meistriliiga season and the holders of the Estonian Cup. If the Meistriliiga champions also won the Estonian Cup then the cup runners-up provide the opposition.

The current supercup holders are Paide Linnameeskond.

Matches

Performance by club

References

External links
Official website

2
Estonia
Recurring sporting events established in 1996
1996 establishments in Estonia